Inteha is a Pakistani Urdu film which was released in 1999 across theaters in Pakistan. The movie was Samina Peerzada's debut directorial attempt and established the careers of its two leading men Humayun Saeed and Zeeshan Sikander. These actors, incidentally, made their debuts with Inteha.

Synopsis
Inteha is the story of Sara (Meera), a young woman from a well-off background, studying at a liberal arts college. Being the introverted sort and romantically inclined, she's a dreamer. With a dad who dotes on his daughter, and a pacifist boyfriend (Zeeshan Sikanadar), life just couldn't get any better for her. This all is shattered when circumstances force her to marry her feudal cousin (Humayun Saeed as Zafar). She finds her new home troublesome.

Cast
 Meera (as Sara)
 Humayun Saeed (as Zafar)
 Zeeshan Sikander (as Farrukh)
 Resham (as Sheena)
 Arbaaz Ali Khan

Film's reception
The film's plot dealt with the issue of marital rape and a few shots detailing the ordeal the lead character goes through, stirred much controversy when Inteha was released during the first half of 1999. As a result, the movie was banned for a few days but was re-released after Peerzada managed to get a stay order from the court. It was a successful movie at the major urban centers in Pakistan and had a good run at Karachi's Nishat theater.

Soundtrack
Inteha's soundtrack composed by Amjad Bobby was much appreciated. Hit tracks included:
 "Kahan tha yeh haseen chehra"
 "Ae meri aarzoo"
 "Humney aisi bhi kya khata kardee"
 "Teri Naraz Nazar"
 "Sun geet naya"

References

External links
 Inteha - IMDB.com

1999 films
1990s Urdu-language films
Pakistani romantic drama films
1999 directorial debut films

Films scored by Amjad Bobby